Ferruccio "Illo" Quintavalle (1914–1998) was an Italian engineer and tennis player.

Biography
A native of Milan, Quintavalle was most active in the 1930s, when he won six national championships in doubles. He played for the Italy Davis Cup team as a doubles specialist from 1934 to 1938, usually partnering Valentino Taroni.

In 1949 he was non-playing captain of the Davis Cup side which reached the Inter-Zonal final.

Quintavalle was general manager of Bianchi and founded automobile manufacturer Autobianchi.

Noted engineer Ercole Marelli was his uncle's father-in-law.

See also
List of Italy Davis Cup team representatives

References

External links
 
 
 

1914 births
1998 deaths
Italian male tennis players
Italian automotive engineers
Engineers from Milan
Tennis players from Milan